The  is a weekend/holiday rapid service train operated by East Japan Railway Company. It operates on the Chūō Line (Rapid) and the Ōme Line from Shinjuku to Oku-Tama in the morning, and from Oku-Tama to Tokyo in the evening. 

This article also discusses the  services which, until 17 March 2023, were the counterpart to the Holiday Rapid Okutama services.

Service pattern 
From 1 December 2001 onwards, the service was upgraded to a regular service, operating on the weekends and holidays.

On weekends and holidays, three trains operate each day. From Shinjuku to Haijima, the Okutama and the Akigawa would be coupled and run together. 

 Westbound trains depart Shinjuku, and decouple at Haijima. The Okutama continues on the Ōme Line to Oku-Tama.
 Eastbound trains depart Oku-Tama (Okutama), couple at Haijima, then head towards Tokyo.

Stations served 
Holiday Rapid Okutama

(Tokyo ← Kanda ← Ochanomizu ← Yotsuya ← ) Shinjuku - Nakano - Mitaka - Kokubunji - Tachikawa - Nishi-Tachikawa - Haijima - Fussa - Ōme - Mitake - Oku-Tama

 Stations listed in brackets are only served by eastbound services only.
 Additionally, the service would stop at extra stops where events are held.
 Yokota Air Base Japanese-American Friendship Festival: Ushihama Station
 Hamura Flower and Water Festival (Tulip Festival): Hamura Station
 Ōme Marathon, Shiofune Kannonji Azalea Festival: Kabe Station
 Yoshino Baigo Plum Festival: Hinatawada Station

Timetable 
The timetable will only list departure time (unless noted) at major stations, namely Tokyo, Shinjuku, Mitaka, Tachikawa, Haijima, Ōme, and Oku-Tama.

Rolling stock 
Current

E233-0 series 6+4 car EMUs
 Decoupling / coupling operations takes place at Haijima Station. East of Haijima, 10-car trains would be operated; West of Haijima, 6-car trains would operate for the Okutama, and 4-car trains would operate for the Akigawa.

Past

201 series 6+4 car EMUs

History 
The  was the counterpart to the Rapid Holiday Okutama that was abolished effective the 18 March 2023 timetable revision. It operated from Shinjuku to Musashi-Itsukaichi in the morning and back towards Tokyo in the evening, on the Chūō Line (Rapid), the Ōme Line, and the Itsukaichi Line. On the same timetable revision, JR East announced that effective on the same day, the direct service on Rapid Holiday Okutama services towards Shinjuku would be truncated at Okutama. The operations were as follows:
Holiday Rapid Akigawa
(Tokyo ← (Coupled with the Okutama) ← ) Shinjuku - (Coupled with the Okutama) - Haijima - Kumagawa - Higashi-Akiru - Akigawa - Musashi-Hikida - Musashi-Masuko - Musashi-Itsukaichi

 The service stops at all stations within the Itsukaichi Line (Haijima - Musashi-Itsukaichi).
 From Tokyo / Shinjuku - Haijima, the service is coupled with the Okutama, hence the stations served are the same.

Future development 
With green cars undergoing testing on the Chūō Line and Ōme Line in 2020, preparations are underway for their eventual entry into service.

References

This article incorporates material from the corresponding article in the Japanese Wikipedia.

Named passenger trains of Japan
East Japan Railway Company
Chūō Main Line
Railway services introduced in 1971
1971 establishments in Japan